Antigona somwangi is a species of clam similar to the type specimen Antigona lamellaris, but the latter differs morphologically in terms of having somewhat pointed anterior and posterior ends, is smaller, is more boldly coloured (the exterior is more darkish and the interior in faded pinkish-orange) and the pallial sinus is relatively shorter about a quarter of shell length.

Distribution: Andaman Sea and Bay of Bengal.

References

External links
 Moerch, O.A.L. (1853). Catalogus Conchyliorum quae reliquit D. Alphonso D'Aguirra & Gadea, comes de Yoldi, regis Daniae cubiculariorum princeps, ordinis Dannebrogici in prima classe & ordinis Caroli Tertii eques. Fasciculus secundus. Acephala. Annulata Cirripedia. Echonodermata. [IV + 76 p.]
 Information at World Register of Marine Species
 Iredale T. (1930) More notes on the marine Mollusca of New South Wales. Records of the Australian Museum 17(9): 384-407, pls 62-65

Veneridae
Molluscs described in 2010